The earliest revenue management model is known as Littlewood’s rule, developed by Ken Littlewood while working at British Overseas Airways Corporation.

The two class model
Littlewood proposed the first static single-resource quantity-based RM model. It was a solution method for the seat inventory problem for a single-leg flight with two fare classes.
The demand has a probability distribution whose cumulative distribution function is denoted . The demand for class 2 comes before demand for class 1. The question now is how much demand for class 2 should be accepted so that the optimal mix of passengers is achieved and the highest revenue is obtained. Littlewood suggests closing down class 2 when the certain revenue from selling another low fare seat is exceeded by the expected revenue of selling the same seat at the higher fare. In formula form this means: accept demand for class 2 as long as:

where

 is the value of the lower valued segment
 is the value of the higher valued segment
 is the demand for the higher valued segment and
 is the capacity left

This suggests that there is an optimal protection limit . If the capacity left is less than this limit demand for class 2 is rejected. If a continuous distribution  is used to model the demand, then  can be calculated using what is called Littlewood’s rule:

This gives the optimal protection limit, in terms of the division of the marginal revenue of both classes.

Alternatively bid prices can be calculated via

Littlewood's model is limited to two classes. Peter Belobaba developed a model based on this rule called expected marginal seat revenue, abbreviated as EMSR, which is an -class model

References

See also
 Yield management
 Expected marginal seat revenue

Pricing